Hamra National Park is a national park in Ljusdal Municipality, Gävleborg County, Sweden.

References

External links 

 Sweden's National Parks: Hamra National Park from the Swedish Environmental Protection Agency

National parks of Sweden
Ljusdal Municipality
Protected areas established in 1909
1909 establishments in Sweden
Geography of Gävleborg County
Tourist attractions in Gävleborg County